Literature of Kashmir has a long history, the oldest texts having been composed in the Sanskrit language. Early names include Patanjali, the author of the Mahābhāṣya commentary on Pāṇini's grammar, suggested by some to have been the same to write the Hindu treatise known as the Yogasutra, and Dridhbala, who revised the Charaka Samhita of Ayurveda.

In medieval times, philosophers of Kashmir Shaivism include Vasugupta (c. 800), Utpala (c. 925), Abhinavagupta, Kshemaraja, and Anandavardhana. If we talk about contemporary poetry of Kashmir there are many poets, which include Asif Tariq Bhat, Tashi Shah, Akeel Mohiuddin Bhat, and Zeeshan Jaipuri.

Kashmiri language literature 

The below listed table marks Kashmiri language poets as per the book, A History of Kashmiri literature by Trilokinath Raina.   
 
{| class="wikitable plainrowheaders" style="font-size:75%;"|
! Name
! scope="col" style="min-width: 7em;" | Years 
! scope="col" | Birthplace
! scope="col" style="min-width: 11em;" | Period
! scope="col" | Remarks
|-
|Lal Ded
||1320–1392
|Pandrethan/Padmanpore (modern Pampore)
||Kashmir Shaivism
|| She was the Kashmiri mystic poet credited with pioneering Vaakh/Vatsun or Shrukh genre of Kashmiri literature.
|-
|Nund Reshi
||1377–1438
|Qaimoh, Kulgam
||Sufism

|Nund Reshi was among the founders of the Rishi order, a Sufi tradition of the region.
|-
|Habba Khatoon
||1554–1609
|Chandhur, Pampore
||Lyricism
|The Queen Poetess was popularly known as the "Nightingale of Kashmir".
|-
|Khwaja Habibullah Ganai Nowsheri
|1555–1617
|Nowshera, Srinagar
|Sufism
|He was a Hafiz Quran, and was very much  fond of singing. He had written some notable Vaakhs too. 
|-
|Rupa Bhawani
||1621–1721
|Khanqah-i-Shokta, Nawakadal (Srinagar at present)
||Mysticism
||Her Vaakhs reveal the influence of both Kashmir Shaivism and Islamic Sufism.
|-
|Sahab Kaul
|b. 1629
|Habba Kadal, Srinagar
|Kashmir Shaivism
|His Krishna Avtaar Charit is the first Kashmiri poem of Leela (Divine play) genre.
|-
|Nunda Dar
|d. 1774
|Village Kaathyul
|Sufism
|He and Syed Ullah Shahabadi are the only two poets who attempted the Ghazal writing successfully before Mahmud Gami.
|-
|Arnimal
||1738–1778 
|Palhalan, Pattan 
||Lyricism
|She is the second poet after Habba Khatoon in the field of love lyrics.
|-
|Mir Abdulla Behaqi
|d. 1798
|N/A
|Sufism
|He is the first Kashmiri poet to adopt Mathnavi (rhyming couplets) as his medium in poetry.
|-
|Swocha Kral
|1774–1854
|Yendragam, Pulwama
|Sufism
|His poetry is an exposition of the philosophy of Wahdat-al-Wajood.
|-
|Momin Saeb
|d. 1800
|Bebagom, Pulwama
|Sufism
|To him belongs the honour of writing the first well-received  Mathnavi in Kashmiri, entitled 'Mantaq-al-tayyar based on Persian mathnavi of the same title by Attar.
|-
|Parmananda
||1791–1864
|Village Seer, Martand (Mattan at present)
||Mysticism
||His most notable works include Radha Swayamvara.
|-
|Shah Qalandar
|d. 1850
|Haigam or Wahthora, Chadoora dist. Budgam 
|Lyricism
|Known for his popular mathnavi 'Adam ta Guljaan (love-story of faqir Adam and Princess Guljaan). 
|-
|Mahmud Gami
||1765–1855
|Dooru Shahabad, Anantnag, Kashmir
||Lyricism
||Popularly known as Jami of Kashmir, he had also translated Nizami's Layla Majnun into Kashmiri titled Lael Majnun. 
|-
|Rahim Saeb
|1775–1850
|Teliwani Mohalla Sopore, Baramulla
|Sufism
|He belonged to the Qadri order of Sufism and was significantly influenced by Lal Ded and Nund Reshi.
|-
|Wali Ullah Motoo
|d. 1858
|Wuhan, Beerwah dist. Budgam
|Sufism
|He has written a Mathnavi based on the legend of Hemal and Nagrai.
|-
|Naem Saeb
|b. 1805
|Habba Kadal, Srinagar
|Lyricism
|Best known for his lyrical ghazals that have been sung by generation of Kashmiris.
|-
|Abdul Ahad Nazim
|1807-1865
|N/A
|Lyricism
|Best Known for his lyrical ghazals that have been sung by generation of Kashmiris.
|-
|Lakshman Joo Raina Bulbul
|1812–1898
|Malapora, Ganderbal Srinagar
|Lyricism
|Wrote the well-known razmia mathnavi Saamnaama, translation of Firdausi's Classic Shahnaama.
|-
|Karam Buland
|d. 1899
|Haanz Gund, Wahthora Budgam
|Lyricism
|He had great love of music, theatre and organizing musical sessions. The NGO- Karam Buland Folk Theatre Group in Budgam is also named after him.
|-
|Maqbool Shah Kralwari
|1820–1877
|Kralwara, Nagam Budgam
|Sufism
|He is best known for his mathnavi 'Gulrez'. 
|-
|Ahmad Batwaer
|1838-1918
|Batawara, Soura Srinagar
|Sufism
|His well known works include Az Boaz Saeni Mudda.
|-
|Rasul Mir
||1840–1870
|Dooru Shahabad, Anantnag
||Romanticism
||Rasul Mir formally inaugurated Ghazal into Kashmiri poetry. Gazals with rivers, valleys, birds, fruits and imagery of Kashmir are his forte.
|-
|Abdul Ahad Nadim
|1842–1911
|Bandipora
|Lyricism
|Had written the social satire Shaharashob.
|-
|Wahab Khar
|1842–1912
|Pampore, Pulwama
|Sufism
|He came from a lineage of poets: his father and grandfather, both blacksmiths by profession, were also venerated Sufi poets.
|-
|Rahman Dar
|d. 1897
|Safa Kadal, Srinagar
|Sufism
|He is best known for his Mathnavi Sheeshrang.
|-
|Shamas Faqir
|1849–1904
|Zaindar, Srinagar
|Sufism
|He belonged to the Qadriya silsila of Sufism and had also written the mathnavi  Mehrajnaama, recounting prophet Muhammad's Mehraj (spiritual journey) to God.
|-
|Pir Ghulam Mohammad Hanfi
|1849–1937
|N/A
|Sufism
|The Kashmiri translation of Quran which was published under the name of Maulvi Yusuf Shah was actually done by Hanfi.
|-
|Krishna Razdan
|1850–1925
|Wanpoh, Anantnag
|Mysticism
|He is known for his Shiv Puraan and Shiv Lagan.
|-
|Aziz Ullah Haqqani
|1854–1919
|Narparistan, Srinagar
|Romanticism
|His best known mathnavi is Mumtaaz Benazir', which had attained the same popularity as Maqbool Shah Kralwari's Gulrez.
|-
|Saif-ud-din Ariz
|N/A
|Pulwama
|Lyricism
|His mathnavi entitled Nav Bahaar, had been translated into Persian. Though, the manuscript remains undiscovered so far.
|-
|Haji Mohammad Alyaas
|1881–1941
|Tsrar Sharief, Budgam
|Romanticism
|He had been inspired by Aziz Ullah Haqqani, and wrote his rendering of the mathnavi Mumtaaz Benazir.
|-
|Mohammad Ismail Nami
|1884–1940
|Kavador, Srinagar
|Lyricism
|He was an extensive traveller of Tibet and had written Tibet Safarnama and Nizami's Sheeren Farhad in Kashmiri.
|-
|Prakash Ram Bhat
|d. 1885
|Devsar dist. Kulgam
|Mysticism
|He is the author of the first Razmia (war) mathnavi in Kashmiri literature, 'Ramavtaar Charit', based on Ramayana.
|-
|Akbar Bhat
|d. 1910
|Anantnag
|Sufism
|He roamed as a fakir all over the valley for two years and after this peregrination wrote the poem Saalgah.
|-
|Kaefi Shah
|d. 1910
|Kothar dist. Udhampur
|Romanticism
|Wrote a romantic mathnavi, Qissa Behraam Shah'
|-
|Abdul Rahim Aima
|d. 1911
|Nagam, Banihal
|Sufism
|His mathnavi 'Gulbadan' is a translation of Muhammad Ali Murad's Urdu mathnavi of the same title.
|-
|Pir Mohi-u-din Miskeen
|d. 1915
|Kulgam 
|Sufism
|Had written 6 masnavis, including Yusuf Zuleikha, Zeba Nigaar and Laal Majnoon.
|-
|Vishna Kaul
|d. 1917
|Kulgam
|Mysticism
|He had translated Valmiki's Ramayana into Kashmiri
|-
|Haji Mohi-ud-din Miskin
|d. 1921
|Srinagar 
|Sufism
|His mathnavi 'Zeba Nigaar' has been credited to Rasul Mir by Abdul Ahad Azad in Kashmiri zuban aur shairi vol.II
|-
|Asad Mir 
|d. 1930
|N/A
|Sufism
|He had written the popular ghazal Yeli Janaan Ralem
|-
|Abdul Qaadir Faarig
|N/A
|N/A
|Sufism
|He was the father of ex-chief minister, Ghulam Mohammad Sadiq
|-
|Ahad Zargar
|1882–1984
|Narvara, Srinagar
|Sufism
|His well known masnavis including- Kaefir Sapdith Korum Iqraar', expressing the philosophy Wahadat-al-Wajood.
|-
|Zinda Kaul
|1884–1965
|Srinagar
|Lyricism
|He had won the Sahitya Akademi award, 1956 for his volume Sumaran (The Rosary).
|-
|Mahjoor
|1887–1952
|Mitrigam, Pulwama
|Lyricism
|Being a revolutionary poet, he is famously known as Shair-e-Kashmir.|-
|Samad Mir
|1892–1959
|Haar Nambal, Narwara Srinagar
|Sufism
|His 'Aka Nandun is the Kashmiri rendering of the legend of prophet Ibrahim and Ishmael.
|-
|Abdul Ahad Zargar
|b. 1908
|Srinagar
|Sufism
|Being a disciple of Samad Mir, his expression was also multi-lingual that assimilated Arabic, Sanskrit and Persian languages and brewed them with Kashmiri language.
|-
|Dina Nath Wali Almast
|1908–2006
|Badyar Bala, Srinagar
|Progressive movement
|His collection of poetry include Bala Yapair (This side of Mountains, 1955) and Sahaavukh Posh (Desert Flowers, 1981).
|-
|Abdul Ahad Azad
|1909–1948
|Chadoora, Budgam
|Lyricism
|He had written the essay Kashmiri zuban aur shairi.
|-
|Mir Ghulam Rasool Nazki
|1910–1998
|Bandipora
|Sufism
|His well known works include Namrodnama.
|-
|Ali Mohammad Gilkar
|d. 1976
|Nowhatta, Srinagar
|Sufism
|He was a great spiritual leader and a great Sufi saint, and popular among masses as Woast bab or Dassil bab. He is best known for his book Kaleed Ludni.
|-
|Mirza Ghulam Hassan Beg Arif
|1910–2005
|Anantnag
|Progressive movement
|Known for his satirical piece Aawaaz-i-dost.
|-
|Dina Nath Nadim
|1916–1988
|Srinagar
|Progressive movement
|Had written an anti-war poem Mae Chhum aash paghich.
|-
|Fazil Kashmiri
|1916–2004
|Srinagar
|Progressive movement
|As a versatile poet he had proven his command or mastery in all genres of poetry – Ghazal, Nazm, Rubai, Qata, Marsiya, Munajat, Na'at, Manqabat, Leela etc.
|-
|Mohiuddin Hajni
|1917–1993
|Bandipora
|Progressive movement
|His play Grees Sund Ghar is the first play in Kashmiri language.
|-
|Lal Aragami
|1923–1988
|Chattibanday Aragam, Bandipora
|Sufism
|His well known works include Sareth Rahbar Lobum Moula.
|-
|Abdul Khaliq Tak Zainageri
|1924–1989
|Hardishiva, Zaingeer Sopore
|Sufism
|It was in 1972 that he laid the foundation of the J& K Yateem Trust. He has also written poems for children, depicting his love for the orphans and the weak.
|-
|Sarwananda Koul Premi
|1924–1990
|Soaf Shalli, Kokernag Anantnag
|Progressive movement
|Mahjoor gave him the name "Premi" (meaning Lover) because his poetry was full of love for Kashmir.
|-
|Amin Kamil
|1924–2014
|Kaprin, Shopian 
|Progressive movement
|His notable works include the collections Beyi Sui Paan and Padis Pod Tshaayi.
|-
|Arjan Dev Majboor
|1924–2015
|Zainpora, Pulwama
|Progressive movement
|He had translated Kalidas's Meghadootam into Kashmiri.
|-
|Janbaz Kishtwari
|1925-1990
|Kishtwar
|Progressive movement
|He is known for his collection of poetry 'Phalwin Sangar'.
|-
|Rehman Rahi
|1925–2023
|Srinagar
|Progressive movement
|His Navroz-e-Saba had won the Sahitya Akademi award, 1961.
|-
|Pushkar Bhan
|1926–2008
|N/A
|Progressive movement
|As a playwright he had collaborated 3 times with Som Nath Sadhu. 
|-
|Ali Mohammed Lone
|1927–1987
|Drogjan, Dal Gate Srinagar
|Progressive movement
|He was a prominent dramatist of Kashmiri language and had written the plays Te Vyeth Rooz Pakaan and Suyya.
|-
|Ghulam Nabi Firaq
|1927–2016
|Naushera, Srinagar
|Progressive movement
|Adapted play Doctor Faustus by Christopher Marlowe into Kashmiri language.
|-
|Akhtar Mohiuddin
|1928–2001
|Srinagar 
|Resistance literature 
|He had written the first novel in Kashmiri language, entitled Dod Dag (1957), and was a prominent short story writer in Kashmiri.
|-
|Ghulam Rasool Santosh
|1929–1997 
|Chinkral, Habba Kadal Srinagar
|Kashmir Shaivism
|As a poet he had been the recipient of Sahitya Akademi award for his poem Be Soakh Rooh (1978).
|-
|Moti Lal Kemmu
|1933–2018
|Srinagar
|Progressive movement
|Being a multi-faceted artist, he had worked as a choreographer for Dina Nath Nadim's Bombur Yembarzal, and Himal Nagrai.
|-
|Naji Munawar 
|1933–2021
|Kaprin, Shopian 
|Modern-age
|Best known for his collection Mwokhta lar, a book of stories for children. 
|-
|Autar Krishen Rahbar
|1934–2020
|Fatehkadal, Downtown Srinagar
|Modern-age
|He was a dramatist, and had written the famous play Badshah. 
|-
|Zeba Zeenat
|1934–present
|Nadihal, Bandipora
|Sufism
|She is a mystic poet whose work is based on self-exploration. 
|-
|Hari Kishan Kaul
|1934–present
|Srinagar
|Modern-age
|He is a well-known playwright and short story writer in Kashmiri. He is best known for his play Yeli Watan Khur Chu Yevan. 
|-
|Ghulam Nabi Gauhar
|1934–present
|Charar-e-Sharief, Budgam
|Modern-age
|He had written the second novel in Kashmiri language, entitled Mujrim (1971).
|-
|Muzaffar Aazim
|1934–present
|N/A
|Modern-age
|His notable works include a play titled Havas ta Haasil.
|-
|Pran Kishore Kaul
|N/A
|N/A
|Modern-age
|He had written the screenplay for the popular Doordarshan Television series Gul Gulshan Gulfaam.
|-
|Som Nath Sadhu
|1935–1982
|N/A
|Modern-age
|Apart from being a significant playwright, he  had also won the Padma Shri (fourth highest Indian civilian award) in 1974.
|-
|Taj Begum Renzu
|1935–2015
|Srinagar
|Modern-age
|She is the first Kashmiri female fiction writer and journalist.
|-
|Mohammad Yousuf Taing
|1935–present
|Shopian
|Modern-age
|His work, Mahjoor Shinasi (A criticism on Mahjoor) won him the Sahitya Akademi Award in 1998.
|-
|Mushtaq Kashmiri
|1936-2022
|Kaw Mohalla, Khanyar, Srinagar
|Resistance literature
|His book Tohfa-e-Shaheed' is written in the memory of his son, Ahmad ul Islam, who was a militant.
|-
|Moti Lal Saqi
|1936–1999
|Bijbehara, Anantnag
|Modern-age
|He received the Sahitya Akademi award in 1981 for Mansar. 
|-
|Sajood Sailani
|1936–2020
|Nowgam, Srinagar
|Modern-age
|He served as a member of Sahitya Akademi's advisory board from 1973 to 1977 and in 1990.
|-
|Chaman Lal Chaman
|1937–1999
|N/A
|Romanticism
|He had represented Kashmir at the National Conference of poets in 1960.
|-
|Ayub Sabir
|N/A
|N/A
|Modern-age
|For his famed book Gulalan Shaadmani, Sabir was awarded children's best literature award by Sahitya Academy New Delhi in 2013.
|-
|Mishal Sultanpuri
|1937–2020
|Sultanpur, Baramulla
|Modern-age
|In 2009 he got the Sahitya Academy award for his book Vont on literary criticism.
|-
|Marghoob Banihali
|1937–2021
|Bankoot, Banihal 
|Modern-age
|He had returned his Sahitya Akademi award in 2015, for his Partavistan (1979), a collection of poetry. 
|-
|Hriday Kaul Bharti
|1937–2020
|Sopore
|Modern-age
|He is best known for his contemporary short stories including- Doan athan hinz dastaan.|-
|Ghulam Nabi Khayal
|1938–present
|N/A
|Modern-age
|He became the first Kashmiri writer to return the Sahitya Akademi award in 2015, for his Gashik Minaar (Luminaries), 1975. 
|-
|Ali Mohammad Shahbaz
|1939–1996
|Shathgund, Handwara
|Resistance literature
|His literary work pictured and voiced the agony of Kashmir conflict.
|-
|Rasool Pampur
|1940–2015
|Hassenpora, Bijbehara
|Sufism
|He was very much  inspired by the Sufi  compositions of Lal Ded and Sheikh-Ul-Alam. 
|-
|Farooq Nazki
|1940–present
|Bandipora
|Modern-age
|He is the son of Ghulam Rasool Nazki.
|-
|Shafi Shaida
|1941–2015
|Akilmir Khanyar, Srinagar
|Modern-age
|As a prominent dramatist, he scripted 26 episodes of Habba Khatoon- the first Urdu drama from Kashmir which was broadcast on DD Kaeshur.
|-
|Omkar Nath Koul
|1941–2018
|Kulgam 
|Modern-age
|He was a prominent linguist of Kashmiri language.
|-
|Zareef Ahmad Zareef
|1943–present
|Aali kadal, Downtown Srinagar
|Modern-age
|Had won the Sahitya Akademi award for Tchoonch poot. 
|-
|Shahnaz Rasheed
|1947–present
|Sopore
|Modern-age
|He released his first book Doad Khatith Guldanan Manz (Pain concealed in flower vases) in 2006, and was highly acclaimed by critics.  
|-
|Rafiq Raaz
|1950–present
|Srinagar
|Modern-age
|He is the author of Arooz Kashir Zaban (Prosody of Kashmiri language).
|-
|Shafi Shauq
|1950–present
|N/A
|Modern-age
|He is the author of Kaeshur Lugaat (Dictionary of Kashmiri language).
|-
|Naseem Shafaie
|1952–present
|Srinagar
|Modern-age
|She is the first Kashmiri women to win the Sahitya Akademi award.
|-
|Basheer Asrar
|1953–2021
|Malaknag, Anantnag
|Modern-age
|He is the founder of 'The District Cultural Association Anantnag’ which is considered to be one of the best forums for new comers as well as senior literary figures.
|-
|Shad Ramzan
|1956–present
|Kulgam
|Modern-age
|He had won the Sahitya Akademi award for '''Kore Kaakud Gome Pushrith' (2014). 
|-
|Aadil Mohi-ud-din
|N/A
|Sumbal, Bandipora
|Modern-age
|He had received the Sahitya Akademi award for his literary criticism entitled- Zol Dith Sadras (2016).
|-
|Aziz Hajini
|1957– 2021
|Hajin, Bandipora
|Modern-age
|He was the former Secretary of Jammu Kashmir Academy of Art Culture and languages (JAACL).
|-
|Sajad Inquilabi
|1964-present
|Khudwani, Kulgam
|Modern-age
|His debut collection of poetry was Poushgound' (Bucket of Flowers). When he wrote this, he was just 14.
|-
|Madhosh Balhami
|1965–present
|Balhama, Pampore Pulwama
|Resistance literature 
|He is particularly known for his recitation of elegies composed for the funerals of militants in Kashmir. 
|-
|Zareefa Jan
|1966–present
|Poshwari, Sonawari Bandipora
|Sufism
|Her poetic world is as fascinating as her mystifying appearance. Her poetry treasure includes a few of her notebooks filled with circles. Those circles or codes can be read by her only.
|-
|Sunita Raina Pandit
|1967-present
|Anantnag
|Modern-age
|Her book 'The Call of Silence(T'chhopi Hindi Aalaw)' was released in collaboration with Jammu Kashmir Academy of Art Culture and languages (JAACL). Her other published kashmiri books are 'Rihij Yaad', 'Suanzal', 'Pott Zooni Vathith', 'Mann Sar Tsyunum', 'Lalli Hindi Maaline Zaayun Lob' and 'Shuri Lyye(HRD Ministry Publication)'.
|-
|Haleema Qadri
|1972–present
|Churmujur, Budgam
|Sufism 
|In 2015, she had self-published her  collection of poetry, entitled Ishq-e-Nabi.
|-
|Nighat Sahiba
|1983–present
|Anantnag
|Modern-age
|She had won the Sahitya Akademi Yuva Puraskar for her Zard Paniek Daer (2017).

|-
|Sofi Ghulam Mohd
|1986-present
|Charari Sharief
|Modern-age
|A critic, short-story writer, translator. He is also the author of Sadre Tchakis tal, Wande Bavath, Sari Harf, pragash etc.   
|-
|Rumuz
|N/A
|Srinagar
|Modern-age 
|As soon as she devoted herself to poetry writing, her verses reflected self-reliance, empowerment, and struggle amidst the valley's strife backdrop.
|-
|Asif Tariq Bhat
|2000–present
|Duderhama, Ganderbal
|Modern-age
|He is the author of Kashmiri novel 'Khawaban Khayalan Manz' (2022).
|}

The use of the Kashmiri language began with the work Mahānaya-Prakāsha by Rājānaka Shiti Kantha (c.1250), and was followed by the poet Lalleshvari or Lal Ded (14th century), who wrote mystical verses in the vaakh or four-line couplet style.  Another mystic of her time equally revered in Kashmir and popularly known as Nund Reshi wrote powerful poetry. Later came Habba Khatun (16th century) with her own style. Other major names are Rupa Bhavani (1621–1721), Paramananda (1791–1864), Arnimal (d. 1800), Mahmud Gami (1765–1855), Rasul Mir (d. 1870), Maqbool Shah Kralawari (1820–1877).  Also, the Sufi poets like Shamas Faqir, Wahab Khar, Soch Kral, Samad Mir, and Ahad Zargar. Among modern poets are Ghulam Ahmad Mahjoor (1885–1952), Abdul Ahad Azad (1903–1948), and Zinda Kaul (1884–1965).

During the 1950s, a number of well educated youth turned to Kashmiri writing, both poetry and prose, and enriched modern Kashmiri writing by leaps and bounds. Among these writers are Dinanath Nadim (1916–1988), Amin Kamil (1923–2014), Sarwanand Kaol Premi (1924–1990), Rehman Rahi (born 1925), Ghulam Nabi Firaq (1927–2016), Ali Mohammed Lone (1928–1987), Akhtar Mohiuddin (1928–2001), Ali Mohammad Shahbaz, Avtar Krishen Rahbar (born 1933), Sajood Sailani, Som Nath Zutshi, Muzaffar Aazim. Some later day writers are Hari Kishan Kaul, Majrooh Rashid, Rattanlal Shant, Hirdhey Kaul Bharti, Omkar N Koul, Roop Krishen Bhat, Rafiq Raaz, Tariq Shehraz, Shafi Shauq, Showkat Shehri, M.H Zaffar, G.M Azad, Anis Hamdani, Barkat Nida, Majrooh Rashid, Shafi Sumbli, Bashar Bashir, Shenaz Rashid, Shabir Ahmad Shabir, Shabir Magami, Tariq Ahmad Tariq, and Moti Lal Kemmu.

Contemporary Kashmiri literature appears in such magazines as "Sheeraza" published by the Jammu & Kashmir Academy of Art, Culture and Languages, "Anhar" published by the Kashmirri Department of the Kashmir University, and an independent magazines/portals like "The Kashmir Tales". "Mountain Ink", Inverse Journal Neab International Kashmiri Magazine published from Boston, Vaakh (published by All India Kashmiri Samaj, Delhi) and Koshur Samachar (published by Kashmiri Sahayak Sammiti, Delhi).

Ancient writers in Sanskrit

Lagadha,Satya Prakash, Founders of Sciences in Ancient India (part II), Vijay Kumar (1989), p.471M. I. Mikhailov & N. S. Mikhailov, Key to the Vedas, Minsk-Vilnius (2005), p. 105Helaine Selin, Encyclopaedia of the History of Science, Technology, and Medicine in Non-Western Cultures, Kluwer Academic Publishers (1997), p. 977 between 1400 and 1200 BC. Wrote Vedanga Jyotisha, the earliest Indian text on astronomy.
Charaka,P. N. K. Bamzai, Culture and Political History of Kashmir - Volume 1, M D Publications (1994), p.268Krishan Lal Kalla, The Literary Heritage of Kashmir, Mittal Publications (1985), p.65 c. 300 BC. One of the most important authors in Ayurveda.
Vishnu Sharma, c. 300 BC. Author of Panchatantra.
Nagasena,Phyllis G. Jestice, Holy People of the World: A Cross-cultural Encyclopedia, ABC-CLIO Ltd (2004), p. 621 c. 2nd century BC. One of the major figures of Buddhism, his answers to questions about the religion posed by Menander I (Pali: Milinda), the Indo-Greek king of northwestern India (now Pakistan), are recorded in the Milinda Pañha.
Tisata, c. 500 AD. A medical writer.
Jaijjata, 5th century, a medical writer and probably the earliest commentator (known) on the Sushruta Samhita, later quoted by Dalhana.
Kalidasa,P. N. K. Bamzai, Culture and Political History of Kashmir - Volume 1, M D Publications (1994), p.261-262 c. 5th century. Widely regarded as the greatest poet and dramatist in the Sanskrit language.
Vagbhata,Anna Akasoy & co., Islam and Tibet: Interactions Along the Musk Routes, Ashgate Publishing Limited (2011), p.76 c. 7th century. Considered one of the 'trinity' (with Charaka and Sushruta) of Ayurveda.
Bhamaha,Satya Ranjan Banerjee, The Eastern School of Prakrit Grammarians: A Linguistic Study, Vidyasagar Pustak Mandir (1977), p. 31John E. Cort, Open Boundaries: Jain Communities and Cultures in Indian History, State University of New York Press (1998), p.57 c. 7th century
 Ravigupta, 700–725. "Ravigupta is, perhaps, the earliest among the Buddhist philosophers of Kashmir..."
Anandavardhana, 820-890
Vasugupta, 860-925
Somananda, 875-925
Vatesvara,Vaṭeśvara, Vaṭeśvara-siddhānta and Gola of Vaṭeśvara: English translation and commentary, National Commission for the Compilation of History of Sciences in India (1985), p. xxvii b. 880, author of Vaṭeśvara-siddhānta.
Rudrata, c. 9th century
Jayanta Bhatta, c. 9th century
Bhatta Nayaka, c. 9th-10th century, considered by Sheldon Pollock to be the greatest author on aesthetics in the pre-modern period
 Medhātithi, c. 9th-10th century, one of the most influential commentators of the Manusmriti 
Utpaladeva, 900-950
Abhinavagupta, c. 950-1020
Vallabhadeva,Sheldon Pollock, Literary Cultures in History: Reconstructions from South Asia, University of California Press (2003), p. 112 c. 10th century. Wrote, amongst other works, Raghupanchika, the earliest commentary on the Raghuvamsa of Kalidasa.
Utpala,Lallanji Gopal, History of Agriculture in India, Up to C. 1200 A.D., Concept Publishing Company (2008), p. 603Dwijendra Narayan Jha (edited by), The feudal order: state, society, and ideology in early medieval India, Manohar Publishers & Distributors (2000), p. 276 c. 10th century. An important mathematician. 
Kshemendra, c. 990-1070
Kshemaraja, c. late 10th century/early 11th century
Kathasaritsagara, c. 11th century
Bilhana, c. 11th century
Kalhana, c. 12th century
Jalhana, c. 12th century, the author of Mugdhopadesa (not to be confused with Jalhana who commissioned the Suktimuktavali)
Sarangadeva, c. 13th century. A musicologist, he wrote Sangita Ratnakara, one of the most important text when it comes to Indian music.

Writers in Persian

After Sanskrit and before the coming Urdu, because of the adoration and patronising policy of Persian culture by the Mughals, Persian became the literary language also of the region. Kashmir was very richly represented in that tradition, as already before the end of the 18th century "Muhammad Aslah's tazkira of the Persian-writing poets of Kashmir, written during the reign of the Mughal emperor Muhammad Shah (1131-61/1719-48), alone lists 303 poets". Late scholar from Pakistan, Pir Hassam-ud-Din Rashidi, edited, translated, and enlarged this work later, and had it published by the Iqbal Academy.

The most famous of them was Muhammad Tahir Ghani (d. 1669), better known as Ghani Kashmiri, whose poetry was recently translated into English, for the first time, by Mufti Mudasir Farooqi and Nusrat Bazaz as 'The Captured Gazelle' in the world-renowned Penguin Classics list. Ghani influenced many generations of Persian-and Urdu writing poets in South Asia including Mir Taqi Mir, Ghalib and most importantly, Iqbal. Ghani's "forte" lies in creating delightful poetic images, usually by stating an abstract idea in the first hemistich and following it up with a concrete exemplification in the other. He also stands out for his multi-layered poems, which exploit the double meaning of words.

Another name in the field of Persian-language writers from Kashmir is Sheikh Yaqub Sarfi Ganai (1521-1595), a 16th-century Sufi poet-philosopher who was internationally acknowledged and who had for students, amongst others, well-known religious scholar Ahmad Sirhindi (more particularly, he taught him hadith)Irshad Alam, Faith Practice and Piety: An Excerpt from the Maktūbāt, Sufi Peace Mission (2006), p. 20 and Persian-language poet Mohsin Fani Kashmiri (d. 1671 or 1672) (himself the teacher of Ghani Kashmiri and author of the pivotal work of comparative religion, the Dabestan-e Mazaheb).

Other of the well-known and influential Persian-language poets of Kashmir would include Habibullah Ghanai (1556-1617), Mirza Dirab Big Juya (d. 1707), Gani Kashmiri (1630–1669), Mirza Beg Akmal Kamil (1645-1719), Muhammad Aslam Salim (d. 1718), Mulla Muhammad Taufiq (1765), Muhammed Azam Didamari (d. 1765), Mulla Muhammad Hamid (1848) or Birbal Kachru Varasta (d. 1865), amongst a myriad. Of course, Kashmiri Pandits too played a role in that school, and one exceptional case was Pandit Taba Ram Turki (1776–1847), who was a celebrity as far as Central Asia.

Writers in Urdu

Despite being a numerically small community, the Kashmiri Pandits are over-represented in their contribution to Urdu literature. One important early example is Daya Shankar Kaul Nasim (1811–1845), a renowned Urdu poet of the 19th century, and hundreds of others followed his path.

Some eminent Urdu literary personalities of Kashmiri origins (from both the Valley and the diaspora) include (in chronological order):

Mir Tafazzul Hussain Khan Kashmiri (1727-1800), originally from Kashmir,Amaresh Misra, Lucknow, fire of grace: the story of its revolution, renaissance and the aftermath, HarperCollins Publishers India (1998), p. 57 born in Sialkot where his parents moved and himself based in Lucknow where he served as Prime Minister (or diwan) to the Nawab of Oudh Asaf-ud-Daula thanks his erudition. He was called "khan-e-allama" (the Scholarly Khan) due to his deep scholarship on many subjects but is best known today for having translated Sir Isaac Newton's Philosophiæ Naturalis Principia Mathematica from Latin into Arabic.
Mufti Sadruddin Khan 'Azurda', 1789–1868, apart from being the Grand Mufti of Delhi, he was also a personal friend to Ghalib (whose own mother was from Kashmir) and himself a poet of note in Urdu as well as in Arabic and Persian. He also wrote a tazkira (biographical anthology of poets).
Momin Khan Momin, 1801–1852, considered one of the three pillars of the Delhi school of Urdu poetry, with Ghalib and Zauq. Other fields where he was competent included mathematics, geomancy, astrology, chess or music.Ali Jawad Zaidi, A History of Urdu literature, Sahitya Akademi (1993), p. 181
Daya Shankar Kaul Nasim, 1811–1845
Ratan Nath Dhar Sarshar, 1846-1903
Muhammad Iqbal, 1877–1938
Agha Hashar Kashmiri, 1879–1935 (called "the Shakespeare of Urdu" for his works as playwright)
Brij Narayan Chakbast, 1882–1926
Aziz Lucknawi, 1882-1935
Khalifa Abdul Hakim, 1896-1959 (a philosopher who has the honour of writing the only book on the metaphysics of Persian mystical poet Jalaluddin Rumi)
Patras Bokhari, 1898–1958
Ghulam Mustafa Tabassum, 1899–1978
Muhammad Din Taseer, 1902-1950 (short-story writer, literary critic and Iqbal scholar. Father of slain Pakistan's Punjab governor Salman Taseer and first individual from the Sub-continent to get a PhD in English Literature from Cambridge University)
Shaikh Abdullah, 1905–1982
Meeraji, 1912-1949
Saadat Hasan Manto, 1912–1955
Agha Shorish Kashmiri, 1917-1975
Syed Akbar Jaipuri (Mujahid-E-Urdu), 1923-1998
Razia Butt, 1924-2012
Anwar Shemza, 1928-1985
Hakeem Manzoor, 1937–2006
Obaidullah Aleem, 1939-2008
Muhammed Amin Andrabi, 1940–2001, a scholar who belonged to the Traditionalist School of metaphysics, inspired by authors like Ibn Arabi, Muhammad Iqbal, Frithjof Schuon, Seyyed Hossein Nasr and Henry Corbin. 
Allama Mustafa Hussain Ansari, 1945–2006
Abid Hassan Minto
Muhammad Asim Butt, novelist, translator and critic. 
Muhammad Younis Butt, writer of the most popular political satire show in Pakistan, Hum Sub Umeed Se Hain''
Rasheed Amjad
Shahid Nadeem

Writers in Hindi
Amar Nath Kak
Chandrakanta (author)
Omkar N. Koul

Writers in English

I. K. Taimni
M. P. Pandit, prolific writer who authored some 150 books and as many articles exposing in English the thought of Sri Aurobindo.
Chiragh Ali, reformist Islamic scholar 
Taufiq Rafat, called the 'Ezra Pound of Pakistan' for both his innovative writings and his position as one of - if not the - greatest English-language poets of Pakistan.
Jawaharlal Nehru
Vijaya Lakshmi Pandit
Krishna Hutheesing
Gopi Krishna
Subhash Kak
Nayantara Sahgal
M.J. Akbar
Salman Rushdie
Hari Kunzru
Kailas Nath Kaul
Agha Shahid Ali
Basharat Peer
Adeeba Riyaz

See also

 List of Kashmiri poets
 List of topics on the land and the people of Jammu and Kashmir
 Kashmir Shaivism - philosophy gives Kashmir its soul, God is universal, in all equally.
 Kashmiriyat - a socio-cultural ethos of religious harmony and Kashmiri consciousness.

References

Culture of Kashmir
Indian literature by language
Kashmiri literature
Literature by language
Pakistani literature